Qaleh (also Romanized as Qal‘eh and Qala) is a village in Kuhgir Rural District, Tarom Sofla District, Qazvin County, Qazvin Province, Iran. At the 2006 census, its population was 63, in 15 families. This village is populated by Azerbaijani Turks.

References 

Populated places in Qazvin County